British Premonitions Bureau was set up in 1966 in the wake of the Aberfan disaster (21 October 1966).

John Barker, a psychiatrist, was first involved in assisting the parents of children who were lost in the Aberfan Disaster. He was told that two children drew pictures of the mudslide over the local school or dreamt about it before it happened. An account of one child, ten year old Eryl Mai, was signed by her parents and attested by Glannant Jones, a local minister. The account, later published by Barker, states: "The day before the disaster she said to her mother: 'Mummy, let me tell you about my dream last night.' Her mother answered gently, 'Darling, I’ve no time. Tell me again later.' The child replied, 'No Mummy, you must listen. I dreamt I went to school and there was no school there. Something black had come down all over it!'". The next day, the disaster struck and the girl was among the dead.

Inspired by this and other stories, Barker wondered if some events, especially violent and extreme in nature, can cause some people to have a premonition about an upcoming tragedy.

Barker contacted and then persuaded the Evening Standard newspaper to ask its readers who thought they might have foreseen the disaster to contact him.

The British Premonitions Bureau was set up with an 11 point system for each report of a future event that came in:

 5 Points for "unusualness"
 5 Points accuracy
 1 Point for timeliness

The first major success occurred on 21 March 1967 when Alan Hencher, one of the individuals who had a premonition about the disaster in Aberfan, called Barker by phone to predict a plane crash "over mountains". He further predicted that 123 or 124 individuals would die in the crash. Thirty days later, a Bristol Britannia passenger aircraft, carrying a hundred and thirty people, attempted to land in Nicosia, Cyprus, during bad weather. The aircraft crashed killing 124 people on board (two survived).

In 1967, its first year, the British Premonitions Bureau collected 469 predictions. Most of them did not come true.

The British Premonitions Bureau closed shortly after its founder, Barker died. He was hospitalized on August 18, 1968 with a brain haemorrhage and died a few days later. A memo left by him was found, telling of two phone calls, one from Hencher and another premonition foreteller, Kathleen Lorna Middleton, both of whom predicted his death and told him about it.

References in Media 

The story of the British Premonitions Bureau is being adapted to the screen based on Sam Knight’s book, The Premonitions Bureau: A True Account of Death Foretold, which was sold to Amazon Prime Video in a 19-way bidding war.

References

Further reading 
 

Prediction
1966 establishments in the United Kingdom
Paranormal organizations